Klaus Lehnertz (born 13 April 1938) is a retired West German pole vaulter. He competed for the United Team of Germany at the 1964 Olympics and won a bronze medal. He also won two medals at the European Cup in 1965-67, but placed only 13th and 9th at the European Championships in 1962 and 1966, respectively. Domestically he held West German outdoor (1959-61 and 1966-68) and indoor titles (1959, 1960 and 1964).

Lehnertz was educated as a skiing teacher, and starting from 1973 taught at the University of Kassel. In 1985 he defended a habilitation, and until 2003 worked as a professor of kinesiology and athletics coach. He also carried out research studies on golf stroke mechanics.

For his Olympic achievement Lehnertz was awarded the Silbernes Lorbeerblatt in 1964 and the Rudolf-Harbig-Gedächtnispreis in 1967. In 1972 he was a member of the IAAF athletics jury.

References

1938 births
Living people
German male pole vaulters
West German pole vaulters
Olympic bronze medalists for the United Team of Germany
Athletes (track and field) at the 1964 Summer Olympics
Athletes (track and field) at the 1968 Summer Olympics
Olympic athletes of the United Team of Germany
Olympic athletes of West Germany
Medalists at the 1964 Summer Olympics
Olympic bronze medalists in athletics (track and field)
People from Solingen
Sportspeople from Düsseldorf (region)